The canton of Auch-1 is an administrative division of the Gers department, southwestern France. It was created at the French canton reorganisation which came into effect in March 2015. Its seat is in Auch.

It consists of the following communes:
Auch (partly)
Barran
Le Brouilh-Monbert
Lasséran
Pavie
Saint-Jean-le-Comtal

References

Cantons of Gers